Abdelali Daraa (born 25 April 1990 in Casablanca, Morocco) is a Moroccan boxer who competed at the 2012 Summer Olympics in the light flyweight division where he lost to Thomas Essomba in the first round.

References 

1990 births
Living people
Light-flyweight boxers
Boxers at the 2012 Summer Olympics
Olympic boxers of Morocco
Sportspeople from Casablanca
Moroccan male boxers
Mediterranean Games bronze medalists for Morocco
Mediterranean Games medalists in boxing
Competitors at the 2013 Mediterranean Games